Osaka is the only album put out by The Kickovers. It was released on April 23, 2002 on the Fenway Recordings record label.

Some promotional copies of Osaka went out with the band's original name, The Brakes. Shortly after, they had to change their name because of a New York City band called The Break.

The album includes one cover, "Hanging on the Telephone", which was originally performed by The Nerves, although a cover of it by Blondie was more popular. "The Good Life" is also the name of a Weezer song, so some fans may have expected it to be a cover, especially since bassist Mikey Welsh was a member of Weezer prior to The Kickovers. Although not a touring members, Dave Aarnoff of The Shods performed bass and Paul Buckley of the bands Orbit and Dear Leader played drums on several tracks of the album.

Track listing
All songs by Nate Albert unless otherwise noted.
 "I'm Plastic" – 0:15
 "Black and Blue" – 2:44
 "Fake in Love" – 2:13
 "Put Me On" – 2:52
 "Under You" – 3:26
 "Heart Attack" – 1:23
 "Regeneration" – 3:28
 "Diamonds to Ashes" – 2:07
 "Hanging on the Telephone" (Jack Lee) – 1:51
 "Crash and Burn" – 4:39
 "Grounded" – 2:30
 "Wake Up" – 2:19
 "The Good Life" – 3:29

Personnel
 Nate Albert – lead vocals, guitar, keyboard, bass
 Mikey Welsh – bass
 Johnny Rioux – guitar, bass
 Joe Sirois – drums
 Dave Aaronoff – keyboard, bass, backing vocals
 Dave Minehan – backing vocals, bass
 Paul Buckley – drums
 Rich Gilbert – pedal steel
 David Mulligan – backing vocals
 Jennifer Malone – backing vocals

The Kickovers albums
2002 debut albums